The People's Convention Party is a former political party in Ghana.

It merged with the National Convention Party in 1996 and became the reformed Convention People's Party.

Defunct political parties in Ghana
Political parties established in 1992
1992 in Ghana
Political parties disestablished in 1996